Graphium schaffgotschi, the Schaffgotsch's swordtail, is a butterfly in the family Papilionidae (swallowtails). It is found in Namibia, Angola, the southern part of the Democratic Republic of the Congo and north-western Zambia. Its habitat consists of savanna.

Adults are on wing year round.

Taxonomy
Graphium schaffgotschi belongs to a clade with six members. All have similar genitalia
The clade members are:
Graphium angolanus (Goeze, 1779)
Graphium endochus (Boisduval, 1836)
Graphium morania (Angas, 1849)
Graphium taboranus (Oberthür, 1886)
Graphium schaffgotschi (Niepelt, 1927)
Graphium ridleyanus (White, 1843)

It was regarded as conspecific with Graphium taboranus by some earlier authorities.

References

Niepelt, W. (1927): Neue exotischer Rhopaloceren. Internationale Entomologische Zeitschrift 21:49-53.

External links
Images of Graphium schaffgotschi Royal Museum of Central Africa

schaffgotschi
Butterflies described in 1927